The 2014–15 División de Honor Juvenil de Fútbol season is the 29th since its establishment. The regular season began on August 30, 2013, and ends on April 19, 2015. The Copa de Campeones will start May 4 and end with the final on May 9 in Almuñécar, Granada. The Copa del Rey starts the week of May 17 and will end on the week of June 27 with the final at the Estadio Alfonso Murube in Ceuta.

Competition format
The champion of each group and the best runner-up will play in the Copa de Campeones and the Copa del Rey.
The other six runners-up and the two best third-placed teams qualify for the Copa del Rey.
In each group, at least four teams (thirteenth placed on down) will be relegated to Liga Nacional.
The champion of the Copa de Campeones will get a place for the 2015–16 UEFA Youth League.

League tables

Group I

Group II

Group III

Group IV

Group V

Group VI

Group VII

Copa de Campeones

Quarter-finals

Semifinals

Final

Details

See also
2015 Copa del Rey Juvenil

References

External links
Royal Spanish Football Federation

División de Honor Juvenil de Fútbol seasons
Juvenil